ARA Sarandí is the fourth and last ship of the MEKO 360H2 series of destroyers built for the Argentine Navy. The ship is also the fourth ship in the Argentine Navy to bear that name. Sarandí is the name of a victory of the Argentine army during the Cisplatine War.

The ship, along with the rest of the Argentine navy is poorly maintained and has inadequate staff training due to a lack of funding and import restrictions. In 2003, the ship fired on a friendly Brazilian warship during a joint training exercise. In 2012, the Almirante Brown class were short of spare parts and suffering engine problems, plus all their ordnance was past its expiry date.

Origin

Sarandí and her sister ships were authorized under the Naval Construction National Plan of 1974, an initiative by the Argentine Navy to replace old World War II-vintage warships which were nearing the end of their operational lives. A contract was signed with the Blohm + Voss Shipyards in Hamburg, West Germany for the construction of four MEKO 360H2 destroyers.

Construction

Sarandís keel was laid down on 9 March 1982 and she was launched on 31 August 1982. The ship was delivered to the Argentine Navy on 23 April 1984 for her sea trials, following which she departed for Argentina, arriving at Puerto Belgrano Naval Base on 21 June 1984.

Service history

In 2003, Sarandi joined the  Carrier Strike Group and Destroyer Squadron 18 as a part of Exercise Solid Step during their tour in the Mediterranean. This marked the first time that a ship of the Argentine Navy inter-operated with a United States Navy battlegroup.

Sarandí was involved in an incident on 29 November 2004, during the annual FRATERNO naval exercise, with ships of the Brazilian Navy. While conducting gunnery practice shots against target drones, a technical failure of her automatic weapons system made her fire on the Brazilian frigate Rademaker, injuring four Brazilian crewmen and an Argentine naval observer, as well as moderate damage to the Brazilian ship.

As of 2021 she was based at Puerto Belgrano as the flagship of the Navy's 2nd Destroyer Division, along with her three sister ships. In 2022, she again participated in an exercise off the coast of Mar del Plata with Espora, Robinson, the corvette  and the transport ship .

Notes

References
 

 

Almirante Brown-class destroyers
Ships built in Hamburg
1982 ships
Destroyers of Argentina